Erica Dunham, better known by her stage name Unter Null, founded the solo aggrotech music project in 1998 at the age of 17, while living in Seattle, United States. , she is based in Portland, Oregon. Dunham is trained in Classical Piano, Cello and Guitar.

History
Unter Null (German for 'below zero') initially began as a powernoise project influenced by a number of similar prominent artists, including Noisex, Converter and P.A.L. Her first, self-titled, album was released in 2001. In 2002, she was signed to Leech and NTT/Annihilvs Records to release her second, web-exclusive album Neocide. In 2005, she signed to label Alfa Matrix. She has since released a number of EPs and albums, remixed several artists, and appeared on compilation albums. Her album The Failure Epiphany peaked at #4 on the German Alternative Charts (DAC) and ranked #43 on the DAC Top Albums of 2006. The same year, the Sacrament EP reached #6 on the DAC Singles chart.

Music
In early 2008, Dunham launched her side project Stray with the release of the self-titled a 2-CD album in cooperation with a number other bands including Mothboy, Detritus and Testube. In addition to regular live performances, Unter Null embarked on a short U.S. and European tour in 2005, then a longer European tour in 2006.

In the spring of 2012, Erica relocated to Hamburg, Germany, where at the time of writing, Erica is currently on production of the next Unter Null album.

House fire
On December 25, 2008, Dunham's studio, containing her musical, recording and electronic equipment as well as other belongings, was destroyed in a fire. It was feared at first that her newest album, Moving On, had been lost in the fire, although tracks were able to be recovered from a damaged hard drive.

Discography

Compilation albums
The Information Apocalypse Compilation (2002, Annilvs), 1000 limited edition copies – Tender Mercies
Re:connected [1.0] (2004, Alfa Matrix)
Synthphony REMIXed! Vol. 3 (2005, Synthphony Records) – Your Nightmare (Da Deep Cut Mix)
Endzeit Bunkertracks: Act I (2005, Alfa Matrix)
Sounds From The Matrix 02 (2005), - Sick Fuck
Endzeit Bunkertracks: Act II (2006, Alfa Matrix) – Sick Fuck (Aesthetic Perfection Mix)
Re:connected [2.0] (2006, Alfa Matrix)
Sounds From The Matrix 03 (2006), - Martyr
Endzeit Bunkertracks: Act III (2007, Alfa Matrix) – Journey to Descent
Sounds From The Matrix 04 (2007), - This Is Your End
Songs in the Key of Death (2008, Sonic Mainline) – DEATHKEY
Industrial Attack Vol.1 (2008), – Zombie Boy
Rape This Industrial World Vol.1 (2008), – Sick Fuck (Album Mix)
Synthetic Reign Volume One (2008), - Feed The Lie
Sounds From The Matrix 07 (2008), - Moving On (Essence Of Mind Mix)
Endzeit Bunkertracks: Act IV (2009), - Broken Heart Cliché
Extreme Sündenfall 9 (2009), - The Fall (Wynardtage Remix)
Kinetik Festival Volume Two (2009), - Prophecy (Blank Mix)
Sounds from the Matrix 08 (2009), - Your Fall
Sounds from the Matrix 09 (2009), - Visceral Venom
Sounds from the Matrix 10 (2009), - I Can't Be The One (EX.ES Mix)

References

External links

 
 Alfa Matrix - unter null's label.
 Unter Null - Facebook
 
 Stray - Unter Null sideproject
 Unter Null - Vampire Freaks
 Unter Null and Stray - Soundcloud

Electro-industrial music groups
Electronic music groups from Washington (state)
American women in electronic music